USS Wasp (CV-7) was a United States Navy aircraft carrier commissioned in 1940 and lost in action in 1942. She was the eighth ship named , and the sole ship of a class built to use up the remaining tonnage allowed to the U.S. for aircraft carriers under the treaties of the time. As a reduced-size version of the  hull, Wasp was more vulnerable than other United States aircraft carriers available at the opening of hostilities. Wasp was initially employed in the Atlantic campaign, where Axis naval forces were perceived as less capable of inflicting decisive damage. After supporting the occupation of Iceland in 1941, Wasp joined the British Home Fleet in April 1942 and twice ferried British fighter aircraft to Malta.

Wasp was then transferred to the Pacific in June 1942 to replace losses at the battles of Coral Sea and Midway. After supporting the invasion of Guadalcanal, Wasp was hit by three torpedoes from Japanese submarine   on 15 September 1942. The resulting damage set off several explosions, destroyed her water-mains and knocked out the ship's power. As a result, her damage-control teams were unable to contain the ensuing fires that blazed out of control. She was abandoned and scuttled by torpedoes fired from  later that evening. Her wreck was found in early 2019.

Design
Wasp was a product of the Washington Naval Treaty.

The Navy sought to squeeze a large air group onto a ship with nearly 25% less displacement than the Yorktown-class. To save weight and space, Wasp was constructed with low-power propulsion machinery (compare Wasps  machinery with Yorktowns , the 's , and the 's ).

Additionally, Wasp was launched with almost no armor, modest speed, and more significantly, no protection from torpedoes. Absence of side protection of the boilers and internal aviation fuel stores "doomed her to a blazing demise". These were inherent design flaws that were recognized when constructed, but could not be remedied within the allowed tonnage. These flaws, combined with a relative lack of damage control experience in the early days of the war, proved fatal.

Wasp was the first carrier fitted with a deck-edge elevator for aircraft. The elevator consisted of a platform for the front wheels of the plane and an outrigger for the tail wheel. The two arms on the sides moved the platform in a half-circle up and down between the flight deck and the hangar deck.

Construction and commissioning
Her keel was laid down on 1 April 1936 at the Fore River Shipyard in Quincy, Massachusetts; launched on 4 April 1939, sponsored by Carolyn Edison (wife of Assistant Secretary of the Navy Charles Edison), and commissioned on 25 April 1940 at the Army Quartermaster Base, South Boston, Massachusetts, with Captain John W. Reeves, Jr. in command.

Service history

1940

Wasp remained at Boston through May, fitting out, before she got underway on 5 June 1940 for calibration tests on her radio direction finder gear. After further fitting out while anchored in Boston harbor, the new aircraft carrier steamed independently to Hampton Roads, Virginia, anchoring there on 24 June. Four days later, she sailed for the Caribbean in company with the destroyer .

En route, she conducted the first of many carrier qualification tests. Among the earliest of the qualifiers was Lieutenant, junior grade David McCampbell, who later became the Navy's top-scoring ace in World War II. Wasp arrived at Guantanamo Bay Naval Base in time to "dress ship" in honor of Independence Day.

A fatal incident marred the carrier's shakedown. On 9 July, one of her Vought SB2U-2 Vindicator dive bombers crashed  from the ship. Wasp bent on flank speed to close, as did the plane-guarding destroyer Morris. The latter's boats recovered items from the plane's baggage compartment, but the plane itself had gone down with its crew of two.

Wasp departed Guantánamo Bay on 11 July and returned to Hampton Roads four days later. There, she embarked planes from the 1st Marine Air Group and took them to sea for qualification trials. Operating off the southern drill grounds, the ship and her planes honed their skills for a week before the Marines and their planes were disembarked at Norfolk, and the carrier moved north to Boston for postshakedown repairs.

While at Boston, she fired a 21-gun salute and rendered honors to President Franklin Delano Roosevelt, whose yacht, stopped briefly at the Boston Navy Yard on 10 August.

Wasp departed the Army Quartermaster Base on 21 August to conduct steering drills and full-power trials. Late the following morning, she got underway for Norfolk, Virginia. For the next few days, while destroyer  operated as plane guard, Wasp launched and recovered her aircraft: fighters from Fighter Squadron 7 (VF-7), and scout bombers from Scouting Squadron 72 (VS-72). The carrier put into the Norfolk Navy Yard on 28 August for repair work on her turbines – alterations which kept the ship in dockyard hands into the following month. Drydocked from 12 to 18 September, Wasp ran her final sea trials in Hampton Roads on 26 September 1940.

Now ready to join the fleet and assigned to Carrier Division 3, Patrol Force, Wasp shifted to Naval Operating Base, Norfolk (NOB Norfolk) from the Norfolk Navy Yard on 11 October. There, she loaded 24 Curtiss P-40 fighters from the Army Air Corps' 8th Pursuit Group and nine North American O-47A reconnaissance aircraft from the 2d Observation Squadron, as well as her own spares and utility unit Grumman J2F Duck flying boats on the 12th. Proceeding to sea for maneuvering room, Wasp flew off the Army planes in a test designed to compare the take-off runs of standard Navy and Army aircraft. That experiment, the first time that Army planes had flown from a Navy carrier, foreshadowed the use of the ship in the ferry role that she performed so well in World War II.

Over the ensuing four days, the carrier's planes flew routine training flights, including dive-bombing and machine-gun practices. Upon arrival at Guantanamo Bay Naval Base, Wasps saluting batteries barked out a 13-gun salute to Rear Admiral Hayne Ellis, Commander, Atlantic Squadron, embarked in battleship  on 19 October.

For the remainder of October and into November, Wasp trained in the Guantánamo Bay area. Her planes flew carrier qualification and refresher training flights, while her gunners sharpened up their skills in short-range battle practices at targets towed by the new fleet tug .

Her work in the Caribbean finished, Wasp sailed for Norfolk and arrived shortly after noon on 26 November. She remained at the Norfolk Navy Yard through Christmas of 1940. Then, after first conducting degaussing experiments with the survey ship , she steamed independently to Cuba.

1941

Arriving at Guantánamo Bay on 27 January 1941, Wasp conducted a regular routine of flight operations into February. Wasp ran gunnery drills and exercises, as well as routine flight training evolutions into March. Underway for Hampton Roads on 4 March, the aircraft carrier conducted a night battle practice into the early morning hours of the 5th.

During the passage to Norfolk, heavy weather sprang up on the evening of 7 March. Wasp was steaming at standard speed, . Off Cape Hatteras, a lookout spotted a red flare at 22:45, then a second set of flares at 22:59. At 23:29, with the aid of her searchlights, Wasp located the stranger in trouble. She was the lumber schooner George E. Klinck, bound from Jacksonville, Florida, to Southwest Harbor, Maine.

The sea, in the meantime, worsened from a state 5 to a state 7. Wasp lay to, maneuvering alongside at 00:07 on 8 March. At that time, four men from the schooner clambered up a swaying Jacob's ladder buffeted by gusts of wind. Then, despite the raging tempest, Wasp lowered a boat, at 00:16, and brought the remaining four men aboard from the foundering  schooner.

Later that day, Wasp disembarked her rescued mariners and immediately went into drydock at the Norfolk Navy Yard. The ship received vital repairs to her turbines. Portholes on the third deck were welded over to provide better watertight integrity, and steel splinter shielding around her  and  batteries was added. Wasp was one of 14 ships to receive the early RCA CXAM-1 radar. After those repairs and alterations were finished, Wasp got underway for the Virgin Islands on 22 March, arriving at St. Thomas three days later. She soon shifted to Guantánamo Bay and loaded maritime supplies for transportation to Norfolk.

Returning to Norfolk on 30 March, Wasp conducted routine flight operations out of Hampton Roads over the ensuing days, into April. For the remainder of the month, Wasp operated off the United states East Coast between Newport, Rhode Island, and Norfolk, conducting extensive flight and patrol operations with her embarked air group. She shifted to Bermuda in mid-May, anchoring at Grassy Bay, Bermuda on the 12th. Wasp sailed for Norfolk three days later with the destroyer  as her anti-submarine screen.

After a brief stay in the Tidewater area, Wasp headed back toward Bermuda on 20 June. Wasp and her escorts patrolled the stretch of the Atlantic between Bermuda and Hampton Roads until 5 July, as the Atlantic Fleet's neutrality patrol zones were extended eastward.

Occupation of Iceland

Following her return to Norfolk on 13 July 1941, Wasp and her embarked air group conducted refresher training off the Virginia Capes. Meanwhile, the situation in the Atlantic had taken on a new complexion, with American participation in the Battle of the Atlantic only a matter of time, when the United States took another step toward involvement on the side of the British. To protect American security and to free British forces needed elsewhere, the United States made plans to occupy Iceland. Wasp played an important role in the move.

Late on the afternoon of 23 July, while the carrier lay alongside Pier 7, NOB Norfolk, 32 Army Air Forces (AAF) pilots reported on board "for temporary duty". At 06:30 the following day, Wasps crew watched an interesting cargo come on board, hoisted on deck by the ship's cranes: 30 P-40Cs and three PT-17 trainers from the AAF 33rd Pursuit Squadron, 8th Air Group, Air Force Combat Command, home-based at Mitchel Field, New York. Three days later, four newspaper correspondents – including the noted journalist Fletcher Pratt — came on board.

The carrier had drawn the assignment of ferrying those vital army planes to Iceland because of a lack of British aircraft to cover the American landings. The American P-40s would provide the defensive fighter cover necessary to watch over the initial American occupying forces. Wasp slipped out to sea on 28 July, with the destroyers  and Walke as plane guards. The heavy cruiser  later joined the formation at sea.

Within a few days, Wasps group joined the larger Task Force 16—consisting of the battleship , the heavy cruisers Quincy and Wichita, five destroyers, the auxiliary , the attack transport , the stores ship , and the amphibious cargo ship . Those ships, too, were bound for Iceland with the first occupation troops embarked. On the morning of 6 August, Wasp, Vincennes, Walke, and O'Brien parted company from Task Force 16 (TF 16). Soon thereafter, the carrier turned into the wind and commenced launching the planes from the 33rd Pursuit Squadron. As the P-40s and the trio of trainers droned on to Iceland, Wasp headed home for Norfolk, her three escorts in company. After another week at sea, the group arrived back at Norfolk on 14 August.

Neutrality patrols

Wasp put to sea again on 22 August for carrier qualifications and refresher landings off the Virginia capes. Two days later, Rear Admiral H. Kent Hewitt, Commander Cruisers, Atlantic Fleet, shifted his flag from the light cruiser  to Wasp while the ships lay anchored in Hampton Roads. Underway on the 25th, in company with Savannah and the destroyers  and Kearny, the aircraft carrier conducted flight operations over the ensuing days. Scuttlebutt on board the carrier had her steaming out in search of the German heavy cruiser , which was reportedly roaming the western Atlantic in search of prey.

In any event, if they had been in search of a German raider, they did not make contact with her. Wasp and her escorts anchored in the Gulf of Paria, Trinidad, on 2 September, where Admiral Hewitt shifted his flag back to Savannah. The carrier remained in port until 6 September, when she again put to sea on patrol "to enforce the neutrality of the United States in the Atlantic".

While at sea, the ship received the news of a German U-boat unsuccessfully attempting to attack the destroyer . The U.S. had been getting more and more involved in the war; American warships were now convoying British merchantmen halfway across the Atlantic to the "mid-ocean meeting point" (MOMP).

Wasps crew looked forward to returning to Bermuda on 18 September, but the new situation in the Atlantic meant a change in plans. Shifted to the colder climes of Newfoundland, the carrier arrived at Placentia Bay on 22 September and fueled from the oiler  the following day. The respite in port was a brief one, however, as the ship got underway again, late on 23 September for Iceland. In company with Wichita, four destroyers, and the repair ship , Wasp arrived at Hvalfjörður, Iceland, on 28 September. Two days earlier, Admiral Harold R. Stark, the Chief of Naval Operations had ordered American warships to do their utmost to destroy whatever German or Italian warships they found.

With the accelerated activity entailed in the US Navy's conducting convoy escort missions, Wasp put to sea on 6 October in company with Vincennes and four destroyers. Those ships patrolled the foggy, cold North Atlantic until returning to Little Placentia Bay, Newfoundland on 11 October, anchoring during a fierce gale that lashed the bay with high winds and stinging spray. On 17 October, Wasp set out for Norfolk, patrolling en route, and arrived at her destination on 20 October. The carrier soon sailed for Bermuda and conducted qualifications and refresher training flights en route. Anchoring in Grassy Bay on 1 November, Wasp operated on patrols out of Bermuda for the remainder of the month.

October had seen the incidents involving American and German warships multiplying on the high seas. Kearny was torpedoed on 17 October, Salinas on 28 October, and in the most tragic incident that autumn,  was torpedoed and sunk with heavy loss of life on 30 October. Meanwhile, in the Pacific, tension between the U.S. and Japan increased almost with each passing day.

While the destroyer operated as plane guard, Wasps air group flew day and night refresher training missions. In addition, the two ships conducted gunnery drills before returning to Grassy Bay two days later, where she lay at anchor on 7 December 1941 during the Japanese attack on Pearl Harbor.

World War II

Atlantic Fleet

Naval authorities felt considerable anxiety that French warships in the Caribbean and West Indies were prepared to make a breakout and attempt to get back to France. Accordingly, Wasp, the light cruiser , and the destroyers  and Wilson, departed Grassy Bay and headed for Martinique. Faulty intelligence gave American authorities in Washington the impression that the Vichy French armed merchant cruiser Barfleur had gotten underway for sea. The French were accordingly warned that the auxiliary cruiser would be sunk or captured unless she returned to port and resumed her internment. As it turned out, Barfleur had not departed after all, but had remained in harbor. The tense situation at Martinique eventually dissipated, and the crisis abated.

Two days later, the carrier moored at the Norfolk Navy Yard to commence an overhaul that would last into 1942.

After departing Norfolk on 14 January 1942, Wasp headed north and touched at NS Argentia, Newfoundland, and Casco Bay, Maine. On 16 March, as part of Task Group 22.6 (TG 22.6), she headed back toward Norfolk. During the morning watch the next day, visibility lessened considerably; and, at 06:50, Wasps bow plunged into Stacks starboard side, punching a hole and completely flooding the destroyer's number one fireroom. Stack was detached and proceeded to the Philadelphia Navy Yard, where her damage was repaired.

Meanwhile, Wasp made port at Norfolk on the 21st without further incident. Shifting back to Casco Bay three days later, she sailed for the British Isles on 26 March 1942 with Task Force 39 under the command of Rear Admiral John W. Wilcox, Jr., aboard the battleship . That force was to reinforce the Home Fleet of the Royal Navy. While en route, Rear Admiral Wilcox was swept overboard from the battleship on the morning of 27 March 1942 and drowned. Although hampered by poor visibility conditions, four SB2U Vindicators from Wasp planes took part in the search, and one of them crashed while attempting to land aboard Wasp, killing its two-man crew. Wilcox's body was spotted an hour after he went overboard, face down in the raging seas, but it was not recovered due to the weather and the heavy seas.

Rear Admiral Robert C. Giffen, who flew his flag in the heavy cruiser , assumed command of TF 39. The American ships were met by a force based around the light cruiser  on 3 April. Those ships escorted them to Scapa Flow in the Orkney Islands. While there, a Gloster Gladiator flown by Captain Henry Fancourt of the Royal Navy made the first landing of the war by a British plane on an American aircraft carrier when it landed on Wasp.

While the majority of TF 39 joined the British Home Fleet – being renumbered to TF 99 in the process – to cover convoys routed to North Russia, Wasp departed Scapa Flow on 9 April, bound for the Clyde estuary and Greenock, Scotland. On the following day, the carrier sailed up the Clyde River, past the John Brown Clydebank shipbuilding facilities. There, shipyard workers paused long enough from their labors to accord Wasp a tumultuous reception as she passed. Wasps impending mission was an important one – one upon which the fate of the island bastion of Malta hung. That key isle was then being pounded daily by German and Italian planes. The British, faced with the loss of air superiority over the island, requested the use of a carrier to transport planes that could wrest air superiority from the Axis aircraft. Wasp drew ferry duty once again to participate in Operation Calendar, one of many Malta Convoys.

Malta Convoys

Having landed her torpedo bombers and dive bombers at Hatston in Orkney, Wasp loaded 47 Supermarine Spitfire Mk. V fighters of No. 603 Squadron RAF at Glasgow on 13 April, then departed on the 14th, this was the start of "Operation Calendar".

Wasp and her consorts passed through the Straits of Gibraltar under cover of the pre-dawn darkness on 19 April, avoiding the possibility of being discovered by Spanish or Axis agents. At 04:00 on 20 April, Wasp spotted 11 Grumman F4F Wildcat fighters on her deck and quickly launched them to form a combat air patrol (CAP) over Force "W". Meanwhile, the Spitfires were warming up their engines in the hangar deck spaces below. With the Wildcats patrolling overhead, the Spitfires were brought up singly on the after elevator, spotted for launch, and then given the go-ahead to take off. One by one, they roared down the deck and over the forward rounddown, until each Spitfire was aloft and winging toward Malta.

When the launch was complete, Wasp retired toward Gibraltar, having safely delivered her charges. However, those Spitfires, which flew in to augment the dwindling numbers of Gladiator and Hurricane fighters, were tracked by efficient Axis intelligence and their arrival pinpointed. Most of the Spitfires were destroyed by heavy German air raids which caught many planes on the ground.

As a result, it looked as if the acute situation required a second ferry run to Malta. Accordingly, Prime Minister Winston Churchill, fearing that Malta would be "pounded to bits", asked President Roosevelt to allow Wasp to have "another good sting." Roosevelt responded in the affirmative. Wasp loaded another contingent of Spitfire Vs at King George V Dock Glasgow and sailed for the Mediterranean on 3 May. Again, Wasp proceeded unmolested. This time, the British carrier  accompanied Wasp, and she, too, carried a contingent of Spitfires bound for Malta. The Spitfires for Eagle had been loaded at Greenock, James Watt Dock, from lighters. This was the start of Operation Bowery.

At 06:30, Wasp commenced launching planes – 11 Wildcats of VF-71 to serve as CAP over the task force. First, Eagle  flew off her 17 Spitfires in two waves; then Wasp flew off 47 more. The first Spitfire took off at 06:43, piloted by Sergeant-Pilot Herrington, but lost power soon after takeoff and plunged into the sea, with loss of pilot and aircraft. The other planes flew off safely and formed up to fly to Malta. An auxiliary fuel tank on another aircraft failed to draw; without the additional fuel the pilot could not make Malta, and his only alternatives were to land on board Waspwith no tailhookor to ditch and take his chances in the water.

Pilot Officer Jerrold Alpine Smith chose to attempt a landing. Wasp, increasing to full speed, recovered the plane at 07:43. The Spitfire came to a stop just  from the forward edge of the flight deck, making what one Wasp sailor observed to be a "one wire" landing. With her vital errand completed, Wasp set sail for the British Isles while a German radio station broadcast the startling news that the American carrier had been sunk; on 11 May, Prime Minister Churchill sent a message to Wasp: "Many thanks to you all for the timely help. Who said a wasp couldn't sting twice?"

Pacific Fleet
Early in May 1942, almost simultaneously with Wasps second Malta run—Operation Bowery—the Battle of the Coral Sea had been fought, then the Battle of Midway a month later. These battles reduced the U.S. to three carriers in the Pacific, and it became imperative to transfer Wasp.

Wasp was hurried back to the U.S. for alterations and repairs at the Norfolk Navy Yard. During the carrier's stay in the Tidewater region, Captain Reeves – who had been promoted to flag rank – was relieved by Captain Forrest P. Sherman on 31 May. The group transited the Panama Canal on 10 June, at which time Wasp and her consorts became TF 18, the carrier flying the two-star flag of Rear Admiral Leigh Noyes.

Arriving at San Diego on 19 June, Wasp embarked the remainder of her complement of aircraft, Grumman TBF-1 Avengers and Douglas SBD-3 Dauntlesses, the latter replacing the old Vindicators. On 1 July, she sailed for the Tonga Islands as part of the convoy for the five transports carrying the 2nd Marine Regiment.

Meanwhile, preparations to invade the Solomon Islands were proceeding to disrupt the Japanese offensive to establish a defensive perimeter around the edge of their "Greater East Asia Co-Prosperity Sphere".

On 4 July, while Wasp was en route to the South Pacific, the Japanese landed on Guadalcanal. Allied planners realized Japanese operation of land-based aircraft from that key island would imperil Allied control of the New Hebrides and New Caledonia area. Plans were made to evict the Japanese before their Guadalcanal airfield became operational. Vice Admiral Robert L. Ghormley – with experience as Special Naval Observer in London – was detailed to take command of the operation; and he established his headquarters at Auckland, New Zealand. Since the Japanese had a foothold on Guadalcanal, time was of the essence; preparations for an allied invasion proceeded with secrecy and speed.

Wasp – together with the carriers  and  – was assigned to the Support Force under Vice Admiral Frank Jack Fletcher. Under the tactical command of Rear Admiral Noyes, embarked on Wasp, the carriers were to provide air support for the invasion and initiation of the Guadalcanal campaign.

Guadalcanal Campaign

Wasp and her airmen practiced day and night operations to hone their skills until Captain Sherman was confident that his airmen could perform their mission. "D-day" had originally been set for 1 August, but the late arrival of some of the transports carrying Marines pushed the date to 7 August.

En route, Wasps engines became a problem, with a 14 July message from CTF 18 to CINCPAC reporting that she had suffered a casualty to her starboard high-pressure turbine that even at lowest speeds was making a loud scraping noise, limiting speed to only  under her port engine thus making air operations entirely dependent on favorable wind. The ship's company was undertaking repairs, including lifting the turbine casing. Repairs to the rotor itself were proposed at "BLEACHER" (Tongatapu, Tonga Islands), where the destroyer tender  was stationed, with four days estimated for the work there. Wasp arrived 18 July for those repairs and on 21 July (21 0802 July) CTF 18 reported Wasp had successfully completed a trial making turns for twenty-seven knots with pre-casualty twenty-five knot operations possible with reduced reliability. Replacement blades were available at Pearl Harbor, and replacement of all three rows of blading was recommended after the ongoing operations were completed.

Then, she changed course to the eastward to reach her launch position  from Tulagi one hour before dawn. Wasps first combat air patrol fighter took off at 05:57.

The early flights of Wildcats and Dauntlesses were assigned specific targets: Tulagi, Gavutu, Tanambogo, Halavo, Port Purvis on Florida Island, Haleta, Bungana, and the radio station dubbed "Asses' Ears".

The Wildcats, led by Lieutenant Shands and his wingman Ensign S. W. Forrer, patrolled the north coast toward Gavatu. The other two headed for the seaplane facilities at Tanambogo. The Grummans, arriving simultaneously at daybreak, surprised the Japanese and strafed patrol planes and fighter-seaplanes in the area. Fifteen Kawanishi H8K "Emily" flying boats and seven Nakajima A6M2-N "Rufe" floatplane fighters were destroyed by Shands' fighters during low-level strafing passes. Shands was credited with four "Rufes" and one "Emily", while his wingman, Forrer, was credited with three "Rufes" and an "Emily" and would later be awarded the Navy Cross for his efforts. Lieutenant Wright and Ensign Kenton were credited with three patrol planes apiece and a motorboat tending the "Emilys"; Ensigns Reeves and Conklin were each credited with two and shared a fifth patrol plane between them. The strafing Wildcats also destroyed an aviation fuel truck and a truck loaded with spare parts.

Post-attack assessment estimated that the antiaircraft and shore battery sites pinpointed by intelligence had been destroyed by the Dauntless dive bombers in their first attack. None of Wasps planes was shot down, but Ensign Reeves landed his Wildcat aboard Enterprise after running low on fuel.

At 07:04, Wasp launched 12 Avengers loaded with bombs for use against land targets, and led by Lieutenant H. A. Romberg. The Avengers silenced resistance by bombing Japanese troop concentrations east of the knob of land known as Hill 281, in the Makambo-Sasapi sector, and the prison on Tulagi Island.

Some 10,000 men had been put ashore during the first day's operations against Guadalcanal, and met only slight resistance. Wasp, Saratoga, and Enterprise – with their screens – retired to the southward at nightfall.

Wasp fighters led by Lieutenant C. S. Moffett maintained a continuous CAP over the transport area until noon on 8 August.

Meanwhile, a large group of Japanese planes approached from Bougainville to attack the transports off Lunga Point. Rear Admiral Richmond K. Turner ordered all transports to get underway and to assume cruising disposition.  Eldridge was leading a formation of Dauntlesses from VS-71 against Mbangi Island, off Tulagi. His rear seat gunner, Aviation Chief Radioman L. A. Powers, assumed the formation of Japanese planes were friendly until six Zeroes bounced the first section with 12 unsuccessful firing passes.

Meanwhile, the leader of the last section of VS-71 – Lieutenant, junior grade Robert L. Howard – unsuccessfully attacked twin-engined Mitsubishi G4M "Betty" medium bombers heading for the American transports, and was engaged by four Zeroes escorting the bombers. Howard shot down one Zero with his fixed  guns while his rear gunner, Seaman 2nd Class Lawrence P. Lupo, discouraged Japanese fighters attacking from astern.

Wasps casualties for the entire action on 7 and 8 August were:
One fighter pilot, Ens. Thaddeus J. Capowski, missing in action when he was separated from the formation. His parents (Mr and Mrs Walter Capowski of Yonkers NY) were notified of TJC's MIA status in early September 1942; shortly thereafter TJC was found safe and alive.
One scout bomber shot down; pilot Lieut.
One fighter landed in the water due to propeller trouble; pilot recovered.
One fighter crashed on deck; pilot injured; plane jettisoned overboard.
One fighter crashed into barrier first day; repaired and flown second day.

Total plane losses for Wasp were 3 Wildcat fighters and 1 Dauntless scout bomber. Against these, her planes destroyed 15 enemy flying boats, 8 floatplane fighters, and 1 Zero.

At 18:07 on 8 August, Vice Admiral Frank Jack Fletcher recommended to Ghormley, at Nouméa, that the air support force be withdrawn. Fletcher, concerned by the large numbers of Japanese planes that had attacked on 8 August, reported that he had only 78 fighters left (he had started with 99) and that fuel for the carriers was running low. Ghormley approved the recommendation, and Wasp joined Enterprise and Saratoga in retiring from Guadalcanal. By midnight, the landing had attained the immediate objectives. Japanese resistance – except for a few snipers – on Gavutu and Tanombogo had been overcome. Early on 9 August, a Japanese surface force engaged an American one in the Battle of Savo Island and retired with minimal damage after sinking four Allied heavy cruisers off Savo Island, including two that had served with Wasp in the Atlantic: Vincennes and Quincy.

After the initial day's action in the Solomons campaign, the carrier spent the next month engaged in patrol and covering operations for convoys and resupply units headed for Guadalcanal. The Japanese began transporting reinforcements to contest the Allied forces.

Wasp was ordered south by Vice Admiral Fletcher to refuel and did not participate in the Battle of the Eastern Solomons on 24 August. After fueling on 24 August Wasp hurried to the battle zone. Her total aircraft group was 26 Grumman F4F Wildcats, 25 Douglas SBD Dauntlesses, and 11 Grumman TBF Avengers. (One SBD Dauntless was earlier lost on 24 August by ditching in the sea because of engine trouble). On the morning of 25 August, Wasp launched a search mission. The Douglas SBD Dauntless of pilot Lieut. But the SBD Dauntlesses sighted no ships. The Japanese fleet had withdrawn out of range. At 13:26 on 25 August, Wasp launched a search/attack mission of 24 SBD Dauntlesses and 10 TBF Avengers against the convoy of Rear Admiral Raizo Tanaka that seemed to be still within range. Although the SBD Dauntlesses shot down a flying boat, they could not find the enemy ships anymore.

During the battle on 24 August Enterprise was damaged and had to return to port for repairs. Saratoga was torpedoed a week later and departed the South Pacific war zone for repairs as well.

Loss
On Tuesday, 15 September 1942, Wasp and Hornet, together with North Carolina and 10 other warships, were escorting the transports carrying the 7th Marine Regiment to Guadalcanal as reinforcements. Her aircraft were being refueled and rearmed for antisubmarine patrol missions and Wasp had been at general quarters from an hour before sunrise until the time when the morning search returned to the ship at 10:00. Thereafter, the ship was in condition 2, with the air department at flight quarters. The only contact with the Japanese that day had been a Japanese four-engined flying boat that was downed by one of Wasp'''s F4F Wildcats at 12:15.

About 14:20, the carrier turned into the wind to launch eight F4F Wildcats and eighteen SBD Dauntlesses and to recover eight F4F Wildcats and three SBD Dauntlesses that had been airborne since before noon. Lt. (jg) Roland H. Kenton, USNR, flying a F4F-3 Wildcat of VF-71 was the last aircraft off the deck of Wasp. The ship rapidly completed the recovery of the 11 aircraft before turning to starboard, heeling slightly as she did so. At 14:44 a lookout reported "three torpedoes ... three points forward of the starboard beam".

A spread of six Type 95 torpedoes was fired at Wasp at about 14:44 from the tubes of the B1 Type submarine . Wasp put over her rudder hard to starboard to avoid the salvo, but it was too late. Three torpedoes struck in quick succession about 14:45; one actually breached, left the water, and struck the ship slightly above the waterline. All hit in the vicinity of the ship's gasoline tanks and magazines. Two of the spread of torpedoes passed ahead of Wasp and were observed passing astern of  before  was hit by one at 14:51 while maneuvering to avoid the other (structural damage from this torpedo hit would eventually lead to O'Brien's sinking a month later).

There was a rapid succession of explosions in the forward part of the ship. Aircraft on the flight and hangar decks were thrown about and dropped on the deck with such force that landing gears snapped. Aircraft suspended in the hangar overhead fell and landed upon those on the hangar deck; fires broke out in the hangar and below decks. Soon, the heat of the intense gasoline fires detonated the ready ammunition at the forward anti-aircraft guns on the starboard side, and fragments showered the forward part of the ship. The number two  mount was blown overboard.

Water mains in the forward part of the ship had been rendered inoperable meaning no water was available to fight the fire forward, and the fires continued to set off ammunition, bombs, and gasoline. As the ship listed 10–15° to starboard, oil and gasoline, released from the tanks by the torpedo hit, caught fire on the water.

At that point, flames made the central station unusable, and communication circuits went dead. Soon, a serious gasoline fire broke out in the forward portion of the hangar; within 24 minutes of the initial attack, there were three additional major gasoline vapor explosions. Ten minutes later Sherman decided to abandon ship as the firefighting was ineffectual. Survivors would have to disembark quickly to minimize loss of life.

After consulting with Rear Admiral Leigh Noyes, Captain Sherman ordered "abandon ship" at 15:20. All badly injured men were lowered into rafts or rubber boats. Many unwounded men had to abandon ship from aft because the forward fires were burning with such intensity. The departure, as Sherman observed it, looked "orderly", and there was no panic. The only delays occurred when many men showed reluctance to leave until all the wounded had been taken off. The abandonment took nearly 40 minutes, and at 16:00 Sherman abandoned the ship once he was satisfied that no survivors were left on board.

Although the submarine hazard caused the accompanying destroyers to lie well clear or to shift position, they carried out rescue operations until , Lansdowne, Helena, and  had 1,946 men embarked. The fires on Wasp, drifting, traveled aft and there were four violent explosions at nightfall. Lansdowne was ordered to torpedo the carrier and stand by until she was sunk. Lansdownes Mark 15 torpedoes had the same unrecognized flaws reported for the Mark 14 torpedo. The first two torpedoes were fired perfectly, but did not explode, leaving Lansdowne with only three more. All three detonated, but Wasp remained afloat for some time, sinking bow-first at 21:00. 193 men had died and 366 were wounded during the attack. All but one of her 26 airborne aircraft made a safe trip to carrier Hornet nearby before Wasp sank, but 45 aircraft went down with the ship.
Another Japanese submarine, duly observed and reported the sinking of Wasp, as other US destroyers kept I-19 busy avoiding 80 depth charges. I-19 escaped safely. 

Wreck located
On 14 January 2019, Wasps wreck was located by the research vessel Petrel.

Awards

See also
 - named for Commander John Shea, died during sinking of Wasp''

References

Bibliography

External links

Navy photographs of Wasp (CV-7)
General Plan for the U.S.S. Wasp (CV-7), hosted by the Historical Naval Ships Association (HNSA) Digital Collections
Combat History of the Supermarine Spitfire – The Defence of Malta (1942)
Oral history interview with Rudolph Cusson, a Petty Officer on the Wasp when it was torpedoed from the Veterans History Project at Central Connecticut State University
Action report U.S.S. WASP (CV7) Loss in Action
USS WASP (CV-7) Detailed history on YouTube

Aircraft carriers of the United States Navy
Ships built in Quincy, Massachusetts
1939 ships
World War II aircraft carriers of the United States
Ships sunk by Japanese submarines
World War II shipwrecks in the Pacific Ocean
Maritime incidents in September 1942
Shipwreck discoveries by Paul Allen
2019 archaeological discoveries